Electronic Frontiers Australia Inc. (EFA) is a non-profit Australian national non-government organisation representing Internet users concerned with online liberties and rights. It has been vocal on the issue of Internet censorship in Australia.

Its main objective is to protect and promote the civil liberties of users and operators of computer-based communications systems such as the Internet.
It also advocates the amendment of laws and regulations in Australia and elsewhere which restrict free speech as well educating the community at large about the social, political, and civil-liberties issues involved in the use of computer-based communications systems.

The organisation has warned against privacy invasions following the distribution of a draft code of practice for ISPs and their response to cybercrime. It has also warned against intellectual property clauses in free trade agreements between Australia and the United States.

History
EFA was created in 1994. Its founders were inspired by the US-based Electronic Frontier Foundation (EFF), but EFA is not affiliated with the EFF. EFA is a founding member of the Global Internet Liberty Campaign.

In 1999, the organisation moved against legislation aiming to filter internet pornography and other material deemed unfit for public consumption online that was pursued by politicians such as Brian Harradine.

The EFA spoke out against the rulings in relation to convicted Holocaust denier Fredrick Töben and his Adelaide Institute, taking the view that "when encountering racist or hateful speech, the best remedy to be applied is generally more speech, not enforced silence." One of the reasons mentioned is that suppressing such content results in perception that the speaker must have something important to say, and "massively increased interest in what would otherwise be marginal ideas."

In 2006, the EFA pushed against Cleanfeed, a mandatory ISP level content filtration system proposed by Kim Beazley. Internet filtering was later pursued by Telecommunications Minister Stephen Conroy.  The EFA presented a petition against mandatory internet filtering with 19,000 signatures to the Australian Senate.

See also

Australian Classification Board
Copyright law of Australia
Internet Australia
Mass surveillance in Australia
Privacy in Australian law

References

External links
 

Internet privacy organizations
Computer law organizations
Internet in Australia
Political advocacy groups in Australia
1994 establishments in Australia